Boggess is a surname. Notable people with the surname include:

Dusty Boggess (1904–1968), American baseball umpire
Effie Boggess (1927–2021), American politician
Sierra Boggess (born 1982), American actress and singer